Torpey is a surname. Notable people with the surname include:

John Torpey (born 1959), American academic, sociologist and historian
Kaitlyn Torpey (born 2000), Australian women's footballer
Noel Torpey (born 1971), American politician
Pat Torpey (1953–2018), American musician
Paul J. Torpey (1937–2019), American mechanical engineer
Steve Torpey (footballer, born 1970), English footballer
Steve Torpey (footballer, born 1981), English footballer